Muhammad Zahid Sheikh (December 14, 1949 – January 29, 2010) was a field hockey player who played for the Pakistan National Hockey Team from 1969 to 1976. He was born at Sialkot. He was capped 34 times and scored 8 goals. He is the Uncle (Chacha gee) of field hockey star Olympions Shahnaz Sheikh and Tariq Sheikh.

References
 Pakistan International Hockey Players
 
 Zahid Sheikh's obituary

External links
 

1949 births
2010 deaths
Pakistani male field hockey players
Olympic field hockey players of Pakistan
Olympic silver medalists for Pakistan
Olympic medalists in field hockey
Medalists at the 1972 Summer Olympics
Field hockey players at the 1972 Summer Olympics
Asian Games medalists in field hockey
Field hockey players at the 1970 Asian Games
Field hockey players at the 1974 Asian Games
Field hockey players from Sialkot
Asian Games gold medalists for Pakistan
Medalists at the 1970 Asian Games
Medalists at the 1974 Asian Games
20th-century Pakistani people